Alec Talbot (13 July 1902 – 13 August 1975) was an English footballer who played as a centre-half for Aston Villa during the 1920s and 1930s.

Talbot signed as a professional for Villa in April 1923, immediately after completing a 10-hour shift down the mines at the colliery in Cannock. He broke into the Villa side in 1924–25, making the position his own from 1928-29 until 1934–35. Talbot assumed the role of club captain on the retirement of Villa great Billy Walker. In all he made 263 appearances, scoring 7 goals for the club.

In the 1931–32 season, Talbot made 45 appearances, the most of any player.

Talbot left Villa for Bradford in June 1935, staying there until the outbreak of World War II.

After the war Talbot started his own dairy business in Stourbridge.

References

1902 births
1975 deaths
People from Cannock
English footballers
Association football central defenders
Aston Villa F.C. players
Bradford (Park Avenue) A.F.C. players
English Football League players
English Football League representative players